Glebe House may refer to:

in England
Glebe House School, Hunstanton, Norfolk
Glebe House, Stamford, Lincolnshire

in Ireland
Glebe House and Gallery, a museum in Letterkenny, County Donegal

in the United States (by state)
 Glebe House (Woodbury, Connecticut), listed on the NRHP in Litchfield County, Connecticut
 Glebe House (New Castle, Delaware)
 Glebe House (Princess Anne, Maryland)
 Glebe House (Poughkeepsie, New York)
Glebe House (Charleston, South Carolina), HABS-documented, included in Charleston Historic District
 Glebe House (Arlington, Virginia)
 Abingdon Glebe House, Gloucester, Virginia
 Glebe House of Southwark Parish, Spring Grove, Virginia
 Glebe House of St. Anne's Parish, Champlain, Virginia

See also
Glebe (disambiguation)